Atle Roar Håland  (born 26 July 1977) is a retired Norwegian football centreback.

Around 1997, he played for Vålerenga IF. Before joining IK Start in 2004, he had been crucial to FK Mandalskameratene's success in the 1. divisjon the previous year. Håland later played more than 5 years in the Danish Superliga for OB Odense and AGF Aarhus before he retired in 2013 due to an injury.

Håland made his debut for Norway in a March 2006 friendly match against Senegal. He has not played any international matches since.

After retiring, Håland was hired by Football Association of Norway's district association in Agder. In 2018 season he became head of player development in IK Start. In 2019 he changed job title to "executive director of sports", working closely with the director of sports Tor-Kristian Karlsen. In the spring of 2019 Håland acted as interim assistant coach of the men's team. When Tor-Kristian Karlsen left in 2020, Håland became director of sports. He resigned as such in 2021, following the sacking of manager Johannes Hardarson.

References

External links
  
 Official Danish Superliga stats 
  

1977 births
Living people
People from Kvinesdal
Norwegian footballers
Vålerenga Fotball players
Mandalskameratene players
IK Start players
Odense Boldklub players
Aarhus Gymnastikforening players
Eliteserien players
Norwegian First Division players
Danish Superliga players
Norwegian expatriate footballers
Expatriate soccer players in the United States
Norwegian expatriate sportspeople in the United States
Expatriate men's footballers in Denmark
Norwegian expatriate sportspeople in Denmark
Association football defenders
Norway international footballers
IK Start non-playing staff
Sportspeople from Agder